Sword of the Lamb is a science fiction novel by American author M. K. Wren published by Berkley Books in 1981.

Plot summary
Alexand, first born of the House of Dekoven Woolf seeks liberty for his people.

Reception
Greg Costikyan reviewed Sword of the Lamb in Ares Magazine #9 and commented that "Sword of the Lamb is neither great literature nor good SF, but it is a 'page-turner.'" James Nicoll stated: "The writing is competent enough, pacing and wandering infodumps aside."

Reviews
Review by Baird Searles (1981) in Isaac Asimov's Science Fiction Magazine, July 6, 1981
Review by Bob Mecoy (1981) in Future Life, November 1981
Review by Debbie Notkin (1982) in Rigel Science Fiction, #3 Winter 1982
Review by Keith Soltys (1982) in Science Fiction Review, Summer 1982
Review by Denise Gorse (1986) in Paperback Inferno, #62

References

1981 novels